Ambositra District is a district in central Madagascar. It is part of Amoron'i Mania Region. Its capital is Ambositra.

Communes
The district is further divided into 21 communes:

 Alakamisy Ambohijato
 Ambalamanakana
 Ambatofitorahana
 Ambinanindrano
 Ambohimitombo
 Ambositra
 Ambositra II
 Andina
 Ankazoambo
 Antoetra
 Fahizay Ambatolahimasina
 Ihadilanana
 Ilaka Centre
 Imerina Imady
 Ivato
 Ivony Miaramiasa
 Kianjandrakefina
 Mahazina Ambohipierenana
 Marosoa
 Sahatsiho Ambohimanjaka
 Tsarasaotra

Roads
the paved RN 7 from Antsirabe to Tulear.
the Route nationale 35 from Ivato to Morondava.
the unpaved Provincial Road 3F to Ambinanindrano.
the National Road 41 from Ambositra to Fandriana.

Mining
There is an Amazonite mine in this municipality of Andina.

References

Districts of Amoron'i Mania